The Sea of Love is the second album by the Irish rock band The Adventures, released in May 1988. Entirely written by band member Pat Gribben, the album was produced by Pete Smith and Garry Bell. The Sea of Love featured the single "Broken Land", their only Top 40 hit in the UK, and also their only chart entry in the United States.

Overview 
Released on Elektra Records under a new contract, the album was their most successful, peaking at #30 on the UK Albums Chart and staying on the chart for 10 weeks. It was certified Silver (for 60,000 copies sold) by the BPI in May 1989. The album also reached #144 on the US Billboard 200, their only album to chart there. Singles released from the album were "Broken Land", "Drowning in the Sea of Love" and "One Step from Heaven", charting at 20, 44 and 82 respectively in the UK, while the first two charted within the top 20 in Ireland. "Broken Land" charted at No. 95 on the Billboard Hot 100, their only charting single in the US.

Reviews of the album were favourable with AllMusic retrospectively rating the album 4 out of 5 crediting the "optimistic" sound of what is a "feel-good album". Also of mention was lead singer Terry Sharpe's vocals as well as the backing vocals and harmonies, while Pat Gribben is said to be "a gifted guitarist" and "musicianship is top notch". In a contemporary review the Miami News also made mention of the strong harmonies saying that it contained "a symphony of gorgeous voices". It rates highly the opening two tracks, likening the latter to Burt Bacharach and Jimmy Webb, while the band hardens its sound on side two with songs such as "Hold Me Now" and "When Your Heart Was Young". They concluded that "the album vibrates with freshness and unadulterated finesse". Smash Hits magazine commented favourably on the album saying that it was an improvement on their debut. Track "The Trip to Bountiful" was based on the film of the same name.

Track listing

All songs written by Pat Gribben

Side one
"Drowning in the Sea of Love" 
"Broken Land" 
"You Don't Have to Cry Anymore"
"The Trip to Bountiful (When the Rain Comes Down)" 
Side two
"Heaven Knows Which Way"
"Hold Me Now" 
"The Sound of Summer"
"When Your Heart was Young" 
"One Step from Heaven"

Bonus tracks on 2017 reissue:
 "Broken Land" (Acoustic Version) 5:19
 "Don't Stand on Me" (B-Side) 4:45
 "Stay Away" (B-Side) 4:37
 "The Curragh of Kildare" (B-Side) (Traditional) 2:50
 "Drowning in the Sea of Love" (Single Version) 4:26
 "One Step from Heaven" (Extended Remix) 5:05
 "Instant Karma!" (John Lennon) 3:08
 "Broken Land" (Single Version) 4:07

Personnel 
Terry Sharpe - Lead vocals
Pat Gribben - Guitar, piano, steel guitar, vocals
Tony Ayre - Bass
Gerard "Spud" Murphy - Percussion, vocals
Paul Crowder - Drums, vocals
Eileen Gribben - Vocals
Andy Findon - Tin whistle
Paul Fishman - Keyboards, keyboard programming and orchestration
Nick Glennie-Smith - Keyboards, piano, synthesizer
Roland Vaughan Kerridge - Electronic percussion
Richard Niles - String arrangements
Andrew Pask - Bass
Peter-John Vettese - Keyboards
Bob White - Uillean pipes
John Whitehead - Keyboards
David Field - Backing vocals
Brian Kennedy - Backing vocals
Katie Kissoon - Backing vocals
Stevie Lange - Backing vocals
McCarthy Sisters - Backing vocals
Peter Smith - Backing vocals
Miriam Stockley - Backing vocals
Billy Vanderpuye - Backing vocals
Rafe McKenna - Engineer
Dietmar Schillinger - Engineer
Jim Scott - Mixing engineer
Simon Fuller - Management
Tony Mascolo - Photography
Keith Breeden - Paintings

Chart performance

References

1988 albums
The Adventures albums
Elektra Records albums